Hafferia is a genus of insectivorous passerine birds in the antbird family, Thamnophilidae.

The genus contains three species:
 Sooty antbird (Hafferia fortis)
 Blue-lored antbird (Hafferia immaculata)
 Zeledon's antbird (Hafferia zeledoni)

These species were formerly included in the genus Myrmeciza. A molecular phylogenetic study published in 2013 found that Myrmeciza, as then defined, was polyphyletic. In the resulting rearrangement to create monophyletic genera these three species were moved to the newly erected genus Hafferia with the blue-lored antbird as the type species. The name of the new genus was chosen to commemorate the German ornithologist Jürgen Haffer.

References

 
Bird genera